Don't Come Searching is a Canadian documentary film, directed by Andrew Moir and released in 2022. An expansion of Moir's 2017 short documentary film Babe, I Hate to Go, the film centres on Delroy Dunkley, a migrant worker from Jamaica who returns from his job in Canada to announce his diagnosis with terminal cancer to his longtime partner Sophia.

The film premiered at the 2022 Hot Docs Canadian International Documentary Festival.

The film was a nominee for the DGC Allan King Award for Best Documentary Film at the 2022 Directors Guild of Canada awards.

References

External links
 

2022 films
2022 documentary films
Canadian documentary films
2020s English-language films
2020s Canadian films
Documentary films about Black Canadians